Amitava Das (born 13 November 1969) is an Indian former cricketer. He played one List A match for Bengal in 1987/88.

See also
 List of Bengal cricketers

References

External links
 

1969 births
Living people
Indian cricketers
Bengal cricketers
People from Asansol